Johan Fritz is a South African rugby league player for the Middelburg Tigers in the Protea Cup. His position is wing. He is a South African international, and has played in the 2013 Rugby League World Cup qualifying against Jamaica and the USA.

References

South African rugby league players
South Africa national rugby league team players
Middelburg Tigers players
Living people
Year of birth missing (living people)